Charles Gibson Lowry FRCOG (1880–1951) was a surgeon at the Royal Victoria Hospital and the Royal Maternity Hospital in Belfast. In 1921 he became professor of midwifery at Belfast. He was a foundation fellow of the Royal College of Obstetricians and Gynaecologists. He served with the Royal Army Medical Corps during the First World War.

References

External links

1880 births
1951 deaths
Fellows of the Royal College of Obstetricians and Gynaecologists
20th-century Irish medical doctors
British Army personnel of World War I
Royal Army Medical Corps officers
Alumni of the Royal University of Ireland